Blue Angels Peak is a mountain located in the Sierra Juárez mountains less than  north of the United States-Mexico border in California. The mountain rises to an elevation of  near the San Diego-Imperial county border and Interstate 8. Despite its relatively low elevation, the summit of Blue Angels Peak is the highest point in Imperial County. A 500 kV power line, an extension of Path 46 into San Diego, traverses the northern foothills of this mountain.

The peak was named in honor of the Navy Flight Demonstration Squadron, the Blue Angels, which was based at a nearby naval air facility in El Centro.

See also
List of highest points in California by county
Colorado Desert
Lower Colorado River Valley

References

External links
 
 

Geography of the Colorado Desert
Mountains of Imperial County, California
Lower Colorado River Valley
Mountains of Southern California